Shamir Medical Center, formerly Assaf Harofeh Medical Center, is a teaching hospital is located on ,  southeast of Tel Aviv, Israel.

History
The Medical Center was named after Asaph the Jew, author of the Oath of Asaph and an early medical text. The facility was established in 1918 as a military hospital of the British Army in the closing days of the First World War. It was located adjacent to the sprawling British military base in Tzrifin (Sarafand). After the creation of the State of Israel, it was converted to an Israeli hospital.

In July 2008, Israeli Olympic fencer Delila Hatuel underwent treatment in the hyperbaric oxygen chamber at the hospital to speed healing from a torn anterior cruciate ligament. She was able to compete at the 2008 Summer Olympics in Beijing the following month.

The hospital was renamed after the former Israeli prime minister Yitzhak Shamir in April 2017.

Services
It is one of Israel's largest hospitals, with over 800 beds.  It serves over 370,000 people in Israel's Central District. As a teaching facility, the hospital is part of the Sackler Faculty of Medicine of Tel Aviv University. On its grounds are the first and largest Israeli academic nursing school and the oldest Israeli school of physiotherapy.

References

Hospitals established in 1918
Hospitals in Israel
Medical education in Israel
Teaching hospitals
Buildings and structures in Central District (Israel)
1918 establishments in British-administered Palestine